Chinnaiah Arulampalam (18 February 1909 – 5 March 1997) was a Sri Lankan Tamil politician and Member of Parliament.

Early life
Arulampalam was born on 18 February 1909.

Career
Arulampalam stood as the All Ceylon Tamil Congress' candidate in Kopay at the 1952 and 1956 parliamentary elections but on each occasion was defeated by the Illankai Tamil Arasu Kachchi (Federal Party) candidate C. Vanniasingam.

Arulampalam stood as the ACTC's candidate in Nallur at the March 1960, July 1960 and 1965 parliamentary elections but on each occasion was defeated by the ITAK candidate E. M. V. Naganathan. He stood again at the 1970 parliamentary election, and on this occasion he won and entered Parliament. He later defected to the governing Sri Lanka Freedom Party (SLFP) and voted for the new republican constitution. He was labelled a traitor by Tamil militants and Tamil nationalists. The SLFP government rewarded Arulampalam by making him Deputy Chairman of Committees in 1976.

Arulampalam contested the 1977 parliamentary election as the SLFP candidate in Nallur but was resoundingly defeated by the Tamil United Liberation Front candidate M. Sivasithamparam.

Arulampalam died on 5 March 1997 in Solano County, California, USA.

References

1909 births
1997 deaths
All Ceylon Tamil Congress politicians
Deputy chairmen of committees of the Parliament of Sri Lanka
Members of the 7th Parliament of Ceylon
People from Northern Province, Sri Lanka
People from British Ceylon
Sri Lankan Tamil politicians
Sri Lanka Freedom Party politicians